David Peter Maxwell Hawker  (born 1 May 1949) is a former Australian politician who served as a Liberal member of the Australian House of Representatives from May 1983 to July 2010, representing the Division of Wannon, Victoria, previously represented by former Prime Minister Malcolm Fraser. 

Hawker served as the 25th Speaker of the House of Representatives from 2004 to 2007.

Background
He was born in Adelaide, and was educated at Geelong Grammar School and the University of Melbourne, where he entered residence at Trinity College in 1968. A graduate in engineering, Hawker was also a farmer and grazier before entering politics. He comes from a family with a long history of political involvement. He is a cousin of Charles Hawker, who was a member of the House of Representatives from South Australia from 1929 to 1938. His great-grandfather, George Charles Hawker, was Speaker of the South Australian House of Assembly from 1860 to 1865.

Career
After Fraser announced his retirement from politics amid the Coalition's heavy defeat in the 1983 federal election, Hawker won the seat in a May 1983 by-election. Hawker was a member of the Opposition Shadow Ministry 1990–93, a Deputy Opposition Whip 1989–90 and 1994, and Chief Opposition Whip 1994–96.

On 15 November 2004 Hawker was chosen by the Parliamentary Liberal Party as its candidate for the position of Speaker of the House of Representatives. He was formally elected to the position on 16 November without opposition. After the 2007 federal election, Labor member Harry Jenkins succeeded Hawker as Speaker of the House, and took office on 12 February 2008.

Hawker announced in June 2009 that he would retire from parliament at the 2010 federal election.

Speaker

As speaker from 2004 to 2007, Hawker was the subject of some controversy.

Early dissent

Some of Hawker's rulings, from motions put by the Australian Labor Party Opposition, were somewhat controversial early in his term, with one session of Question Time on 1 December 2004 resulting in twelve points of order, some continuously raised, to Brendan Nelson's response to a question on school funding raised by Sophie Mirabella, in that it was seen by the Opposition to anticipate debate. This session resulted in a dissent motion regarding the permission of ministers tabling documents at the end of answers, which was negatived. A further dissent motion was raised on 7 December 2004, regarding questions asked relating to public affairs but not directly regarding the subject's portfolio, specifically, the desire of the Opposition to question De-Anne Kelly to her supposed approval of funding of a project not relating to her portfolio of Veterans' Affairs. This dissent motion was also voted down. Likewise, a motion of dissent on 28 November 2005 to a ruling that the Member for Perth resume his seat, having twice ignored an instruction to desist in argument across the chamber, was voted down. (Immediately thereafter, the motion to place further motions on notice was passed without a vote, and the Speaker responded to the Leader of the Opposition's subsequent Point of Order by stating that the motion was a "request".)

Questions over impartiality
A 2006 ruling made by Hawker after an incident during a heated exchange in the House brought further motions of dissent from the Opposition, and drew criticism of the Speaker's impartiality from the media.

After a motion regarding share trading was moved by Kelvin Thomson, the Member for Wills, on 25 May 2006, Leader of the House Tony Abbott referred to Thomson indirectly using unparliamentary language by moving the motion "that that snivelling grub be no longer heard". The Deputy Chair at the time, Peter Lindsay, did not make comment against to the withdrawal Abbott made using the words "if I have offended grubs, I withdraw unconditionally". Later, the Speaker assumed the Chair, but it was only after the Opposition attempted to move a dissent motion that Abbott withdrew "unconditionally any imputation or offensive words against the member for Wills".

When Manager of Opposition Business Julia Gillard however attempted to mimic exactly the exchange of 25 May by moving the motion "that that snivelling grub over there be not further heard" against Abbott on a health legislation amendment, and then stating that "If I have offended grubs, I withdraw unconditionally", the Speaker asked Gillard to withdraw "without reservation". Gillard responded that "in accordance with your ruling yesterday, I have withdrawn effectively", but the Speaker then said that "I have no option...but to name the member", and subsequently by motion from Abbott, Gillard was removed from the House for 24 hours.

The Opposition had earlier asked questions to the Speaker about the apparent impartiality of the latter ruling, but criticism of the decision reached the media, with the Speaker defending the decision made referring to Abbott's later unconditional withdrawal. Under standing order 94A, the Speaker can throw members out of the parliament without a verbal warning for one hour. This rule has frequently been used to expel disruptive opposition members from the parliament. During the Question Time debate over the government's controversial Industrial Relations reforms some eleven Labor members were thrown out in one day.

Honours
On 11 June 2012, he was named an Officer of the Order of Australia for "distinguished service to the Parliament of Australia, to public administration and monetary policy reform, and to the community through local government, health and sporting organisations."

References

External links
Personal website
Parliament Biography

1949 births
Living people
Liberal Party of Australia members of the Parliament of Australia
Members of the Australian House of Representatives
Members of the Australian House of Representatives for Wannon
Australian people of English descent
People educated at Geelong Grammar School
People educated at Trinity College (University of Melbourne)
Politicians from Adelaide
Speakers of the Australian House of Representatives
Officers of the Order of Australia
21st-century Australian politicians
20th-century Australian politicians